Okayama International Circuit (岡山国際サーキット), formerly known as TI Circuit Aida (TIサーキット英田) before 2005, is a  private motorsport race track in Mimasaka, Okayama Prefecture, Japan. TI was the abbreviation of "Tanaka International" after the name of the golf club owner, Hajime Tanaka, though the name of the circuit was officially "TI Circuit Aida".

As well as hosting racing events, the circuit has rental facilities including bikes and go karts available.

History
The course was opened in 1990 as a private motor racing track for the wealthy. Soon, it hosted its first race, staged by veteran British drivers.

It was discontinued primarily due to its location in a remote area of the country. The event was also planned to host a race of the 1996 International Touring Car Championship season in August to replace the F1 race, but the race was instead moved to Suzuka Circuit, held in November.

In 1999, defending JGTC GT300 champion Shingo Tachi was killed when he tested a GT500 Toyota Supra after he suffered from a technical failure that prevented him from slowing down for the first turn. Although there was no driver fatality in the JGTC or Super GT race events beforehand, the incident occurred almost a year after Tetsuya Ota's near-fatal, fiery accident at Fuji Speedway.

In March 2003, the Tanaka International Company, parent company of the official circuit owner TI Circuit Company, applied for civil rehabilitation. After the application, Unimat Holding Co., Ltd. announced that it would financially support the TI Circuit Company in keeping the facility open. The company was renamed Okayama International Circuit Co., Ltd. on May 1, 2004, and the circuit was renamed Okayama International Circuit on January 1, 2005. 

On October 26, 2008, the circuit hosted a round of the Formula V6 Asia and FIA World Touring Car Championship. The WTCC race was the first FIA world championship race since 1995. However, it was announced on June 21, 2010 that Suzuka Circuit would host the Japan round of the 2011 WTCC season instead of the Okayama International Circuit.

On March 3, 2012, Unimat sold the circuit to Aska Corporation, an auto parts manufacturing company.

Events

 Current

 April: Super GT
 June: Formula Regional Japanese Championship Okayama Challenge Cup Race, TCR Japan Touring Car Series
 August: GT World Challenge Asia Fanatec Japan Cup, GT4 Asia Series
 September: Super Formula Lights, MFJ Superbikes
 October: Super Taikyu

 Former

 Asian Le Mans Series 1000 km of Okayama (2009)
 F4 Japanese Championship (2015–2019)
 Formula BMW Pacific (2009–2010)
 Formula One Pacific Grand Prix (1994–1995)
 Formula Toyota (2005–2006)
 Formula V6 Asia (2008)
 Japan Le Mans Challenge (2006–2007)
 Super Formula Championship (2007–2008, 2015–2020)
 World Touring Car Championship FIA WTCC Race of Japan (2008–2010)

Lap records 

The outright unofficial all-time track record is 1:10.218, set by triple-world champion Ayrton Senna in a Williams FW16, during qualifying for the 1994 Pacific Grand Prix. The official race lap records at the Okayama International Circuit are listed as:

Notes

References

External links

 Okayama International Circuit official website – 
 Asian Festival of Speed results

Formula One circuits
Pacific Grand Prix
Motorsport venues in Japan
Sports venues in Okayama Prefecture
World Touring Car Championship circuits
Sports venues completed in 1990
1990 establishments in Japan
Mimasaka, Okayama